Pichl may refer to:

Pichl bei Wels, a municipality in the district of Wels-Land, Upper Austria
Pichl-Preunegg, a municipality in the Liezen, Austria
Pichl-Kainisch, a village in the Salzkammergut, Liezen, Austria
 (Außer- and Inner-) Pichl, village(s) in the municipality of Gsies, South Tyrol

People with the surname
Wenzel Pichl (1741–1805)

See also
Pichler, a surname